Cylindera colmanti is a species of ground beetle of the subfamily Cicindelinae. It is found in countries such as Cameroon, Equatorial Guinea, Rwanda, Uganda, and the Congos.

References

colmanti
Beetles described in 1899
Taxa named by Walther Horn
Beetles of Africa